The Phoenix Incident is a 2015 American science fiction horror film written and directed by first time director Keith Arem, and starring Yuri Lowenthal, Troy Baker, Liam O'Brien, Michael Adamthwaite, Jamie Tisdale and Brian Bloom. Presented as a documentary found footage film based on real events, it is set in the present day and focuses upon an alleged conspiracy behind the Phoenix lights, a mass UFO sighting which occurred in Phoenix, Arizona, and Sonora, Mexico, on Thursday, March 13, 1997. On that date, lights of varying descriptions were reported by thousands of people between 19:30 and 22:30 MST in a space of about 300 miles (480 km) from the Nevada state line, through Phoenix, to the border of Tucson. The film focuses on the main events in and around Phoenix during this time.

Plot 

The Phoenix Incident begins with the night vision observation of a scorpion, moving across the screen before cutting to a series of military firefight engagements in Damal, Turkey, Dayr Az Zawr, Syria and Mogadishu, Banadir, Somalia, often with alien cries heard during these engagements. Expository text explains that, since 1997, the United States military has been engaged in a covert war against "forces of unknown origin", and that "57 incidents have spread across Asia, Europe and Russia." It goes on to note that NATO notes that alien invasion forces will reach populated areas within two years, and that the conflict itself is in retaliation for an incident in Phoenix, Arizona on March 13, 1997. The film notes that it is dedicated to "members of the intelligence community who provided evidence that made the film possible".

Tying into the film's viral campaign, the film introduces the disappearance of four Arizona men. Heaven's Gate cult member Walton S. Gayson (Adamthwaite), initially held as a suspect in the murder of the four men, was taken into federal custody. Later, the search for the men was suspended, concluding that the four men had been killed in a bear attack, a conclusion which the local medical examiner denies, but was ordered to list as the cause of death.

The documentary style film moves between two complementary plotlines; the first is a filmed interview with an unidentified Air Force pilot who exposes, despite likely repercussions, the truth about what happened to four missing civilian men on the night of the Phoenix Lights. The second plotline comes from recovered filmed footage ("The Lauder Tapes") by one of four men: Glenn Lauder (Lowenthal), Mitch Adams (Willingham), Ryan Stone (Baker) and Jacob Reynolds (O'Brien). Lauder cannibalizes several different cameras, even duct taping a camcorder to the side of his ATV helmet. It is from these cameras that most of the footage is derived.

The interviewed officer details how the military detected the approach of a triangular-shaped object in the tail of the passing Hale-Bopp comet until it began to descend into Earth's atmosphere over Arizona. Later, the object goes missing and two KH satellites in the area had stopped transmitting.

The men decide to go out to the foothills by the Sierra Estrella to spend time together and ride their ATVs. Mitch, whose brother was a former US Marine is excited about the trip, his friends substantially less so. While packing their truck for the trip, the men notice a growing military air presence in the area, first helicopters and then F-15 fighter jets and A-10's, as well as odd atmospheric disturbances. When they embark on their trip in Ryan's truck, it suddenly breaks down in the foothills. Jacob tries to repair the damage to the vehicle while the others try to find someplace to call for Roadside assistance. They come across a desert compound, protected by an electrified fence, owned by the reclusive Walton S. Gayson. A highly agitated Gayson accosts Jacob at the truck, warning him that they must leave immediately. Despite the warning, the men set off in their ATVs into the foothills anyway.

Further questioned, the Air Force officer details how several "bogeys" had entered Nevada's airspace before turning towards Phoenix. By this time, several eyewitnesses had already seen the multiple crafts, and Operation Snowbird goes into effect: a diversion operation to distract the civilian population with decoy flares while an aerial dogfight ensues between Air Force jets and the unidentified craft at the Barry M. Goldwater Air Force Range.

The four men witness the dogfight when an alien craft is disabled and crashes into a nearby hill. Mitch's brother had been killed in a helicopter crash, so he decides to try and render aid to what he presumes is a human pilot. Upon reaching the downed craft, before the military can respond, the men are attacked by defensive creatures that faintly resembles man-sized scorpions; Jacob is severely injured in the attack. Their ATVs are destroyed by the aliens, and they take refuge in Gayson's compound. Gayson has been awaiting the coming of the creatures for years to be abducted and taken to a "higher plane" of existence, so he turns off the electric fence, letting the creatures in.

In the final act, Jacob is abducted, and Mitch is ripped apart in an attempt to defend Ryan and Glenn, who are almost rescued by a military helicopter. After the helicopter is shot down by one of the UFOs, Ryan distracts the creatures before being dragged off by one of them and Glenn runs into a vehicle to hide from them, before making a run for it alone. However, just as it seems he has escaped, one of the aliens attacks him. As his helmet flies off, Glenn is killed out of the view of the camcorder before the creature disappears, and one of the alien spacecraft slowly leaves the area. Gayson later finds the helmet and recovers the camcorder's film.

In a post-credits scene, it is revealed that Gayson escaped prison shortly after his interview. In the next scene, a clean-shaven Gayson douses himself in gas and sets himself on fire, preparing to 'rise above this world". The scene leads viewers into the online viral campaign, revealing how the Lauder Tapes were discovered.

Cast 
Yuri Lowenthal as Glenn Lauder
Mason Joyce as Glenn (Age 4)
Travis Willingham as Mitch Adams
Troy Baker as Ryan Stone
Liam O'Brien as Jacob Reynolds
Michael Adamthwaite as Walton Samuel Gayson
Brian Bloom as LAFB Pilot
Jamie Tisdale as Melissa Henessey
James Patrick Stuart as David Collins
Fife Symington III as himself
John McCain as himself
Mark Withers as Bill Lauder
Karl Girolamo as Young Bill Lauder
Deborah Geffner as Susan Lauder
Leah Stoltz as Young Susan Lauder
Maria Bobeva as Sue Ellen Gayson
Constance Broge as Michelle Stone
Paul Thomas Arnold as Daniel Adams
James Burns as Ken Adams
Randy Hamilton as DMAF pilot
Frances Barwood as herself
Timothy Ley as himself
Jamie Fauth as Carl Conner
Matthew Godbey as Avondale Officer
Ryan Keating as Lt. Col. James Edwards
Holgie Forrester as Marsha Reynolds
William Goldman as	Dr. Robert Weissman, M.E.
James Brewster as Major Jonathan Shapiro
Elise Muller as Krissy Thompson
Tony Prince as Rick Thompson
Dan Willoughby as Cmdr Bryce Shepard
Scot Ruggles as Lt. S. Jordan
Mark McClain Wilson as Police 1
Erika Elyse as Police 2
Ron Ross as Henry Reynolds
Brandon White as Mark Adams
Mary Beth McDade as herself
Rick Debruhl as himself
Rebecca Grant as herself
Tamara Henry as herself
Rick Chambers as himself
Cher Calvin as herself
Craig Michaels as himself
Tom McNamara as himself
Marla Tellez as herself
Micah Olman as himself
Michael Watkiss as himself
Valerie Arem as Operator
Matthew Mercer as Pilot
Paul Vinson as Tow Truck Driver
Arif S. Kinchen as Eyewitness
Jeff Boatman as Helicopter Pilot

Production 

Before production and release of the movie, Director Keith Arem, noted for his work in video games and graphic novels, began a four-year long transmedia marketing campaign, using twenty hidden websites, social media accounts, and blogs to drop "digital breadcrumbs" about a "vast military cover-up over the disappearance of four friends off-roading in the mountains near Phoenix after witnessing the U.S. military shoot down a UFO". This viral marketing campaign was so effective that the U.S. Department of Justice and Arizona military officials investigated the film makers, and many news media outlets such as The Mirror (a British tabloid), Yahoo News (a US-based news aggregator) and the Business Standard (an Indian English-language daily newspaper) reported the viral marketing campaign as real news events.

Release 

The Phoenix Incident was initially theatrically released with Fathom Events on March 10, 2016. An international version of the film was pre-released in the UK on September 7, 2015. The filmmakers partnered with gaming, UFO, and horror sites to promote the film's viral campaign, and released over 4 hours of additional content and story from the film. The film was awarded Best Feature at the Capital Cities Film Festival, Best Feature at the ICE Film Festival, and Vision Award at the Boston SciFi Film Festival. The movie was nominated for Best Horror at the Palm Beach Film Festival, and showcased at the BIFAN International Film Festival in South Korea. The film was featured at the 69th Roswell Festival in New Mexico. The film won Best Narrative Feature and Best Director at the Los Angeles Underground Film Festival.

The film makers utilized social media sites and sponsors, including Fathom Events, AMC, Hollywood Today, Regal, Fandango, Celestron, Shazam, and Lootcrate to distribute hidden content and supplemental clips from the motion picture and viral campaign. Director Keith Arem announced that an interactive/investigation version of the film as an iOS app would be released to contain all of the hidden content from the entire campaign. The Phoenix Interactive UFO Investigation App was released in July 2019 at San Diego Comic Con.

See also 
 Found footage (film technique)

References

External links 
 
 
 

2015 films
2015 horror films
2010s supernatural horror films
2010s science fiction horror films
Alien abduction films
American supernatural horror films
American science fiction horror films
Camcorder films
Films set in 2015
Films set in Arizona
Films shot in Arizona
Films scored by John Paesano
Found footage films
American mockumentary films
UFO-related films
2010s English-language films
2010s American films